Everard Vernon Sydney Plackett (21 September 1896–1949) was an English footballer who played in the Football League for Derby County and Notts County.

References

1896 births
1949 deaths
English footballers
Association football midfielders
English Football League players
Derby County F.C. players
Notts County F.C. players